The 1989–90 Romanian Hockey League season was the 60th season of the Romanian Hockey League. Six teams participated in the league, and Steaua Bucuresti won the championship. The final round was cancelled after 17 games due to the Romanian Revolution.

First round

Final round

Promotion/Relegation

External links
hochei.net

1989–90
Romanian
Rom